Raymond C. "Ray" Albright (February 28, 1934 – July 31, 2017) was an American businessman and politician.

Albright was born in Paint Rock, Alabama. He graduated from Central High School and the Vanderbilt School of Banking. In 1953 he started working at Combustion Engineering where he worked for 19 years making covers for boilers. During this time, he was believed to have been exposed to asbestos. He was diagnosed forty years later with mesothelioma.

Albright was involved in the banking business in Chattanooga, Tennessee, joining the United Bank in 1970 and then as a senior vice president of Union Planters National Bank.

Albright served in the Tennessee House of Representatives from 1969 to 1971 and was a Republican. He then served in the Tennessee Senate from 1971 to 1995.

References

1934 births
2017 deaths
Politicians from Chattanooga, Tennessee
People from Jackson County, Alabama
Businesspeople from Tennessee
Republican Party members of the Tennessee House of Representatives
Republican Party Tennessee state senators
20th-century American businesspeople